Fengyang Flower Drum is a traditional Chinese folk song, a form of Quyi, from Fengyang County, Anhui Province that was developed during the late Ming Dynasty. Originally, it was performed by two seated female singers (usually sisters-in-law). It was typically performed in public for gratuities, as Fengyang County was prone to flooding from the Yellow River.

History
The Fengyang Flower Drum song was associated with beggars from Fengyang County which experienced a disastrous series of flood and drought during the late Ming Dynasty, forcing residents to sing for money. It is classed as one of the speech-song folk arts of Quyi.

The form was popularized by its appearance in The Good Earth, the 1937 film adaptation of a novel by Pearl S. Buck. Chou Wen-Chung, an American emigrant from China, incorporated it into his 1949 composition Landscapes.

References

External links
Example of Fengyang Flower Drum on YouTube

Chinese storytelling
Chinese folk music
Songs about drums